Ariadna ustulata is a species of tube-dwelling spider that is endemic to the Seychelles. It has not been recorded on Mahé since 1894, and appears to be restricted to Mont Dauban on Silhouette Island. Its adult population is estimated to be about 7,000 individuals. It is restricted to cloud forests, where it lives in mosses. It is threatened by habitat deterioration from invasive plants, especially Cinnamomum verum, and drying of cloud forests due to climate change.

References

Segestriidae
Endemic fauna of Seychelles
Critically endangered animals
Spiders of Africa
Spiders described in 1898